The Eighth and Broadway Historic District is one of the seven national historic districts located in Columbia, Missouri.  The district is made up of three contributing properties and is located at the intersection of Eighth and Broadway Streets in Downtown Columbia. They consist of the Beaux-Arts style Miller Building (1910), the Italianate style Matthews Hardware (c. 1894), and the Art Deco style Metropolitan Building (c. 1930). Today, the area holds loft apartments and several local business including Rally House, Sycamore, Peace Nook, and Geisha.

It was listed on the National Register of Historic Places in 2003.

References

Historic districts on the National Register of Historic Places in Missouri
Italianate architecture in Missouri
Beaux-Arts architecture in Missouri
Art Deco architecture in Missouri
Geography of Columbia, Missouri
National Register of Historic Places in Boone County, Missouri